"More Is More" is a song performed by American pop recording artist Heidi Montag, and was released on April 3, 2009. The uptempo dance-pop song is lyrically about going to a club with friends and receiving attention from men. The song debuted at number 50 on Billboard Hot Dance Club Songs chart in July 2009 and peaked at number 27, becoming Montag's first and only charting single to date.

Music and lyrics
"More is More" is an uptempo dance-pop song that makes heavy use of synthesizers, especially the auto-tune software to alter Montag's voice. Lyrically, the song is about going to the club with friends, drinking and receiving male attention. In the second half of the song, the lyrics switch from being club-oriented to more sexual.

Chart performance
On the Billboard issue dated July 1, 2009, "More Is More" debuted on the Hot Dance Club Songs chart at number 50, becoming Montag's first song to chart, despite not being released as a single. After five weeks on the chart, it peaked at number 27.

Charts

Track list
More Is More remix promo CD
More Is More (Ralphi Rosario clean club mix)
More Is More (Ralphi Rosario dirty club mix)
More Is More (Ralphi Rosario dub mix)
More Is More (Dave Aude radio edit)

References

2009 singles
Dance-pop songs
Heidi Montag songs
Songs written by LP (singer)
Songs written by Steve Morales
2009 songs